In particle physics, the Peccei–Quinn theory is a well-known, long-standing proposal for the resolution of the strong CP problem formulated by Roberto Peccei and Helen Quinn in 1977. The theory introduces a new anomalous symmetry to the Standard Model along with a new  scalar field which spontaneously breaks the symmetry at low energies, giving rise to an axion that suppresses the problematic CP violation. This model has long since been ruled out by experiments and has instead been replaced by similar invisible axion models which utilize the same mechanism to solve the strong CP problem.

Overview

Quantum chromodynamics (QCD) has a complicated vacuum structure which gives rise to a CP violating θ-term in the Lagrangian. Such a term can have a number of non-perturbative effects, one of which is to give the neutron an electric dipole moment. The absence of this dipole moment in experiments requires the fine-tuning of the θ-term to be very small, something known as the strong CP problem. Motivated as a solution to this problem, Peccei–Quinn (PQ) theory introduces a new complex scalar field  in addition to the standard Higgs doublet. This scalar field couples to d-type quarks through Yukawa terms, while the Higgs now only couples to the up-type quarks. The scalar field also has a potential

where  is known as the decay constant, necessarily set to the electroweak scale  GeV to ensure that the scalar field behaves similarly to the Higgs field.

Spontaneous symmetry breaking of the Peccei–Quinn symmetry below the electroweak scale gives rise to a pseudo-Goldstone boson known as the axion , with the resulting Lagrangian taking the form

where the first term is the Standard Model (SM) and axion Lagrangian which includes axion-fermion interactions arising from the Yukawa terms. The second term is the CP violating θ-term, with  the strong coupling constant,  the gluon field strength tensor, and  the dual field strength tensor. The third term is known as the color anomaly, a consequence of the Peccei–Quinn symmetry being anomalous, with  determined by the choice of PQ charges for the quarks. If the symmetry is also anomalous in the electromagnetic sector, there will additionally be an anomaly term coupling the axion to photons.

To minimize the ground state energy, the axion field picks the vacuum expectation value , with axions now being excitations around this vacuum. This prompts the field redefinition  which leads to the cancellation of the  angle, dynamically solving the strong CP problem.

Invisible axion models

For the Peccei–Quinn model to work, the decay constant must be set at the electroweak scale, leading to a heavy axion. Such an axion has long been ruled out by experiments, for example through bounds on rare kaon decays . Instead, there are a variety of modified models called invisible axion models which introduce the new scalar field  independently of the electroweak scale, enabling much larger vacuum expectation values, hence very light axions. 

The most popular such models are the Kim–Shifman–Vainshtein–Zakharov (KSVZ) and the Dine–Fischler–Srednicki–Zhitnisky (DFSZ) models. The KSVZ model introduces a new heavy quark doublet with PQ charge, acquiring its mass through a Yukawa term involving . Since in this model the only fermions that carry a PQ charge are the heavy quarks, there are no tree-level couplings between the SM fermions and the axion. Since the two Higgs doublets carry PQ charge, the resulting axion couples to SM fermions at tree-level.

See also

 Axion
 QCD vacuum
 Strong CP problem

References

Further reading

Physics beyond the Standard Model
Quantum chromodynamics
Anomalies (physics)